The Canton of Yerville is a former canton situated in the Seine-Maritime département and in the Haute-Normandie region of northern France. It was disbanded following the French canton reorganisation which came into effect in March 2015. It consisted of 18 communes, which joined the canton of Yvetot in 2015. It had a total of 10,782 inhabitants (2012).

Geography 
The altitude varies from 89m (Hugleville-en-Caux) to 177m (Saussay) with an average altitude of 213m.

The canton comprised 18 communes:

Ancretiéville-Saint-Victor
Auzouville-l'Esneval
Bourdainville
Cideville
Criquetot-sur-Ouville
Ectot-l'Auber
Ectot-lès-Baons
Étoutteville
Flamanville
Grémonville
Hugleville-en-Caux
Lindebeuf
Motteville
Ouville-l'Abbaye
Saint-Martin-aux-Arbres
Saussay
Vibeuf
Yerville

Population

See also 
 Arrondissements of the Seine-Maritime department
 Cantons of the Seine-Maritime department
 Communes of the Seine-Maritime department

References

Yerville
2015 disestablishments in France
States and territories disestablished in 2015